The Battle of Los Angeles was an anti-aircraft artillery barrage in February 1942 over Los Angeles, California, in response to a perceived attack on the continental United States by Imperial Japan, subsequently attributed to a case of "war nerves" likely triggered by a lost weather balloon.

Battle of Los Angeles may also refer to:

Historical events
 Battle of Los Ángeles, a military action fought on March 22, 1880, between the Chilean and Peruvian armies during the Tacna and Arica Campaign of the War of the Pacific
 Siege of Los Angeles, which took place in August 1846 during the Mexican–American War
 1992 Los Angeles riots, which occurred in April and May 1992 following the acquittal of police officers involved in the arrest and beating of Rodney King

Entertainment
 The Battle of Los Angeles (album), a 1999 album by Rage Against the Machine
 Battle: Los Angeles, a 2011 science fiction and action film directed by South African filmmaker Jonathan Liebesman
 Battle of Los Angeles (film), a direct-to-DVD science-fiction film by independent film company The Asylum, based on the same concept
The Battle for L.A.: Footsoldiers, Vol. 1, a 2004 documentary about rap battling in Los Angeles
 The title of ninth issue of The Champions, a comic book by Marvel Comics

Sports events
 The Battle of Los Angeles (professional wrestling), an annual professional wrestling tournament held by Pro Wrestling Guerrilla
 A nickname for various sports rivalries, such as:
 El Tráfico, between the LA Galaxy and Los Angeles FC (soccer)
 Freeway Face-Off, between the Anaheim Ducks and Los Angeles Kings (ice hockey)
 Freeway Series, between the Los Angeles Angels and Los Angeles Dodgers (baseball)
 SuperClasico, between the LA Galaxy and Chivas USA (soccer)
 the Lakers–Clippers rivalry (basketball)
 the annual USC–UCLA football game (college football)
 games involving the Los Angeles Raiders (American football)

Other
 "The Great Battle of Los Angeles", a painting by California artist Sandow Birk

See also
 1941 (film), a 1979 film by Steven Spielberg, loosely based on the Battle of Los Angeles